Frunză may refer to:

Frunză, Ocnița, a town in Ocniţa district, Moldova
Frunză, Transnistria, a commune in Slobozia district, Transnistria, Moldova
Frunza, a village in Logrești, Gorj County, Romania

People with the surname
Nicolae Frunză (born 1997), Romanian tennis player
Sorin Frunză (born 1978), Romanian footballer
Viorel Frunză (born 1979), Moldovan footballer

See also
 Frunze (disambiguation)